Gilbert Kolly (born 25 October 1951) is a Swiss judge and President of the Federal Supreme Court of Switzerland since 2012.

Works

References

External links
Kolly Gilbert

Living people
1951 births
Federal Supreme Court of Switzerland judges
21st-century Swiss judges